Finally Out of P.E. is the debut and only album by American actress and singer Brie Larson, released on October 18, 2005, by Casablanca. The album features 13 tracks, some of which were co-written by Larson, and focuses on the ups and downs of being a teenager.

In an interview, Larson, then aged 16, stated, "I think that I write about stuff that others don't write about. I don't have a bunch of love songs cause I don't really have much boy experience. I just write about what I am actually going through in my real life. That's where the title from my album comes from – Finally out of P.E. My P.E. teacher didn't like me at all, which was hard to deal with cause I was usually such a teachers' pet. So when I found out I got my record deal, I was like, 'Yes, I'm finally out of P.E.""

The song "Hope Has Wings" was featured on the 2005 animated film Barbie and the Magic of Pegasus.

Commercial performance
Due to many delays in release dates, the album was expected to be released in the fall 2004, However, the album was later released on October 18, 2005. The album sold a total of 4,000 copies in the United States.

Track listing

All track titles, and writing credits appear courtesy of AllMusic.

Personnel
Executive Producers: Tommy Motolla & Bruce Carbone
A&R: Sal Guastella
A&R Coordinators: Joanne Oriti & Chris Apostle
A&R Administration: Barbara Wesotski
Management: Brad Patrick & Randy Buzzelli for PMG
Mastered by: Chris Gehringer at Sterling Sound
Art Direction: Sandy Brummels
Design: Joe Spix
Photography: Tony Duran
All credits appear courtesy of AllMusic.

Recording locations
Tracks 01, 03, 05, 10, 11, 14 recorded at Cove City Sound Studios, L.I., New York
Tracks 02, 06 recorded at Soulpower Studios, Los Angeles, CA
Track 04 recorded at Big Baby Recording, LLC, New York, N.Y.
Tracks 07, 08, 12 recorded at Westlake Audio, Hollywood, CA
Track 09 recorded at Canyon Reverb Studio, Topanga, CA
Track 13 recorded at The Poolhouse, Long Island, NY and The Village Recorded, Los Angeles, CA

References

2005 debut albums
Albums produced by Soulshock and Karlin
Albums with cover art by Tony Duran
Brie Larson albums
Casablanca Records albums